Sisig (Sumerian: si-si\-[ig], Akkadian: Zaqīqu, "spirit" or "ghost") is the dream god in Sumerian religion and the son of the sun god Utu. He is named in the Iškar Zaqīqu, an eleven tablet compendium of oneiromancy written in Akkadian.

References

Mesopotamian gods